Alaska 1741-1953 was a book written by Dr. Clarence C Hulley; PhD; History and Physical Sciences, published in 1953.

The book has received reviews from Pacific Historical Review, The American Historical Review, Foreign Affairs, British Columbia Historical Quarterly, and The New York Times.

References

Books about Alaska